Wilhelm Molly (1838–1919) was a doctor, philatelist, activist, and Esperantist.

He was the chief medical doctor of the Vieille Montagne mining company.

As an avid philatelist, he tried to organize a local postal service with its own stamps. This enterprise was quickly thwarted by Belgian intervention.

In 1908, Molly proposed to make Neutral Moresnet the world's first state with Esperanto as its official language, named Amikejo ( Place of Friendship).

See also
 History of Esperanto

References

1838 births
1919 deaths
People from Wetzlar
People from the Rhine Province
German philatelists